Gold Strike Canyon-Sugarloaf Mountain Traditional Cultural Property is listed on the National Register of Historic Places in Boulder City, Nevada.

History 
The TCP consists of approximately 676 acres of land encompassing two sites, Gold Strike Canyon and Sugarloaf Mountain, that have been significant to the traditional cultural beliefs of the Mojave, Southern Paiute, and Hualapai (and most likely other tribes) for thousands of years. The site is on land administered by the Bureau of Reclamation and the National Park Service.

References 

National Register of Historic Places in Clark County, Nevada
Boulder City, Nevada
Historic districts on the National Register of Historic Places in Nevada